XL2 may refer to:
Canon XL-2, a camcorder model
Emerald Coast XL2 Sport, American powered parachute design
Liberty XL2, American light aircraft design
XL2, an album by the Chinese Filipino singer Xian Lim
XL2 Academy, the name used by the New York Excelsior for the video game Overwatch